The Eames Lounge Chair Wood (LCW) (also known as Low Chair Wood or Eames Plywood Lounge Chair) is a low seated easy chair designed by husband and wife team Charles and Ray Eames.

The chair was designed using technology for molding plywood that the Eames developed before and during the Second World War. Before American involvement in the war, Charles Eames and his friend, architect Eero Saarinen, entered a furniture group into the Museum of Modern Art's "Organic Design in Home Furnishings Competition" in 1940, a contest exploring the natural evolution of furniture in response to the rapidly changing world. Eames & Saarinen won the competition. However, production of the chairs was postponed due to production difficulties, and then by the United States' entry into WWII.  Saarinen left the project due to frustration with production.

Charles Eames and his wife Ray Kaiser Eames moved to Venice Beach, LA in 1941. Charles took a job as a set painter for MGM Studios to support them. Ray, formally trained as a painter and sculptor, continued experiments with molded plywood designs in the spare room of their apartment. In 1942 Charles left MGM to begin making molded plywood splints for the United States Navy.  The splints used compound curves to mimic the shape of the human leg.  The experience of shaping plywood into compound curves contributed greatly to the development of the LCW.

Design development

The entries Charles Eames & Eero Saarinen submitted into the Organic Furniture competition were designed with the seat and backrest joined in a single 'shell'. The plywood, however, was prone to crack when bent into the sharp curves the furniture demanded. The competition entries were covered with upholstery to hide these cracks.

Through extensive trial and error, Charles and Ray arrived at an alternate solution: create two separate pieces for the seat and backrest, joined by a plywood spine and supported by plywood legs. The result was a chair with a sleek and honest appearance. All of the connections were visible and the material was not hidden beneath upholstery. The seat was joined to the spine and legs with four heavy rubber washers with embedded nuts, subsequently called 'shock mounts'. The shock mounts were glued to the underside of the seat, and screwed in through the bottom of the chair. The backrest was also attached using shock mounts. From the front and top the seat and back are uninterrupted by fasteners. The rubber mounts were pliable, allowing the backrest to flex and move with the sitter. This technology is also one of the chair's greatest flaws. The shock mounts are glued to the wooden backrest, but may tear free for various reasons. A common response to this problem was to drill directly through the backrest and insert fasteners between the backrest and the lumbar support. This devalues the chair, since it changes the original aesthetic of smooth, uninterrupted wooden forms.

Coming out of an age where furniture was heavy and complex; made from multiple materials and then covered in upholstery, the Eames design was striking. The chair was produced from 1946 until 1947 by Evans Molded Plywood of Venice Beach, California for the Herman Miller furniture company in Zeeland, Michigan. In 1947 Herman Miller moved the production of the chairs to Michigan, where production continues—after a hiatus from 1957 to 1994. In Europe, Vitra became the producers of Eames furniture. Herman Miller and Vitra are the only two companies producing chairs licensed by the Eames estate as represented by the Eames Office.

See also
Eames Lounge Chair

References

External links
Herman Miller product page for LCW

Chairs
Works by Charles and Ray Eames
Individual models of furniture